The Chapel of the Most Holy Trinity at the United States Military Academy is a Catholic church and place of worship for many members of the United States Military Academy Corps of Cadets. Completed in 1900, it is the oldest chapel on the West Point campus in continual use, although the 1836 Old Cadet Chapel, moved in 1910 to West Point Cemetery, is still in use for funeral services and weekly Lutheran denominational services. Most Holy Trinity Chapel was expanded in 1959.

See also
United States Army Chaplain Corps
United States Air Force Academy Cadet Chapel (including Catholic chapel)

References

Further reading

External links

Most Holy Trinity Chapel home page
Office of the USMA Chaplain

United States Military Academy
Military chapels of the United States
Roman Catholic churches in New York (state)
University and college chapels in the United States
Roman Catholic churches completed in 1900
Gothic Revival church buildings in New York (state)
Roman Catholic chapels in the United States
1900 establishments in New York (state)
20th-century Roman Catholic church buildings in the United States